Yury Sergeyevich Lovets (born 11 July 1996) is a Belarusian professional footballer who plays for Gomel.

Career
In January 2020 he signed with Swedish side AFC Eskilstuna along with Nikita Patsko. However, after the start of 2020 Superettan season was delayed due to COVID-19 pandemic, both players returned to Belarus and re-signed with Arsenal Dzerzhinsk.

References

External links 
 
 

1996 births
Living people
Belarusian footballers
Association football midfielders
Belarusian expatriate footballers
Expatriate footballers in Sweden
FC Minsk players
FC Torpedo Minsk players
FC Chist players
AFC Eskilstuna players
FC Arsenal Dzerzhinsk players
FC Slavia Mozyr players
FC Gomel players